Iran ranks 1st in fruit production in the Middle East and North Africa. Iran has been ranked between 8th and 10th in global fruit production in different years. Iran produces Persian walnut, melon, tangerine, citrus fruits, Kiwifruit, dates, cherries, pomegranates, peach, oranges, raisins, saffron, grapes and watermelon.

Fruit growing areas in Iran
A number of fruits have originated in Iran, including Persian walnuts, muskmelons, and pomegranates, Apple, Apricot, Grape, Fig, Citron, and many more. The country benefits from a variety of favorable meteorological conditions suitable for fruit production. The northern seaside lands of the Caspian Sea, and the country supplies finest conditions for citrus production. Kiwifruit production, although a relatively new activity in this part of the world, has grown increasing importance in last few years and the Iranian kiwifruit promises to become a great export item of the agricultural sector of the country.

Production and ranking
Iran ranks 1st in fruit production in the Middle East and North Africa. 2.7 million hectares of orchards are being harvested in Iran with an annual production this year of 16.5 million tons. Per capita production of fruit in the globe is 80 kilograms while in Iran it is 200 kg according to official FAO statistics. The Iranian calendar year ending in March 2010, Iran produced 4.5 million tons of citrus fruits and 3 million tons of apples. Iran has been ranked between 8th and 10th in global fruit production in different years. In the productions of pomegranates and pistachios, Iran ranks first, in dates and cherries, 2nd, 4th in the production of apples and walnuts, and, 7th in producing citrus fruits.

Iran grows fifty different kinds of fruit. The record for pomegranate production is 100 tons in a hectare of land, 146 ton for apples and 70 tons for oranges.
In 2010 Iran exported $2 billion worth of fruit to neighboring countries and the European Union, 46 percent more than the previous year. In the second half of 2010 the import of agricultural goods in Iran increased 30 percent in weight and 14 percent in value which shows the country's good progress in the field of agricultural goods production.
Since 1963 Iran is one of the leading producers and exporters of dried fruit and nuts such as all kinds of pistachios, Sultana raisins, golden raisins, sun-dried raisins, Malayer raisins, Kashmar raisins, almonds, all kinds of Iranian dates and with its modern facilities is ready to provide its customers with all these products.

Dates product
Iran is one of the world's largest date producers. Iran exports Mazafati, Kimia, Piarom, or Maryami dates.

References

See also
Agriculture in Iran

 
Fruit production